Estonia competed at the 2019 European Games, in Minsk, Belarus from 21 to 30 June 2019. Estonia sent 68 competitors, which was their all-time high in European Games. Of the 15 sports, Estonia took part in 13 – all sports besides beach soccer and table tennis.

Medalists

Competitors 
Estonia was represented by 68 athletes in 13 sports.

Archery

Recurve

Compound

Athletics

Track events

Field events

Team event

Reserves:
Mari Klaup-McColl Mirell Luik
Johannes Treiel
Enari Tonström
Merilyn Uudmäe
Sten Ütsmüts

Badminton

Basketball 3x3

Men
Kristjan Evart
Egert Haller
Renato Lindmets
Sander Viilup

Women
Merike Anderson
Kadri-Ann Lass
Annika Köster
Janne Pulk

Boxing

 
 
Men

Canoe sprint

Men

Cycling

Road

Track

Gymnastics

Rhythmic
Women's group

Judo
Men

Karate

Men

Sambo

Men

Women

Shooting

Men

Women

Wrestling

Key:
 VFO – Victory by forfeit
 VPO – Victory by points – the loser without technical points
 VPO1 – Victory by points – the loser with technical points
 VSU – Victory by technical superiority – the loser without technical points and a margin of victory of at least 8 (Greco-Roman) or 10 (freestyle) points
 VSU1 – Victory by technical superiority – the loser with technical points and a margin of victory of at least 8 (Greco-Roman) or 10 (freestyle) points

Men's Greco-Roman

Men's freestyle

Women's freestyle

References

External links
Team page at minsk2019.by
Team page at eok.ee Estonian Olympic Committee

Nations at the 2019 European Games
European Games
2019